Cora arcabucana is a species of basidiolichen in the family Hygrophoraceae. It was formally described as a new species in 2016 by Manuela Dal Forno, Camilo Rodríguez, and Robert Lücking. The specific epithet arcabucana refers to the type locality in the Arcabuco, (Boyacá, Colombia). Cora davidia is a closely related species.

References

arcabucana
Lichen species
Lichens described in 2016
Lichens of Colombia
Taxa named by Robert Lücking
Basidiolichens